Woman Thou Art Loosed is a 2004 American drama film directed by Michael Schultz and written by Stan Foster. It was produced by Stan Foster and Reuben Cannon. It is the 44th film or series directed by Schultz and is adapted from the self-help novel by T. D. Jakes. The film tells the story of a young woman who must come to terms with a long history of sexual abuse, drug addiction, and poverty. It has been reported that the story was loosely based on the screenwriter's past relationship with a college girlfriend. A gospel stage play, written, directed, and produced by Tyler Perry, preceded the film.

Plot

Michelle Jordan, a former inmate, is granted probation and released to a halfway house. As one of the conditions for her probation, she attends a Church Revival where she runs into family friend Twana and an old friend from childhood named Todd. Todd is a father recently divorced from a woman named Keisha, whom everyone in high school stated had an uncanny  physical appearance to Michelle. When the Bishop questions Michelle on her mother, Cassey's, intentions Michelle states she is unsure, and separate flashbacks show Cassey's life has not been pleasant either. Cassey's boyfriend Reggie, is an alcoholic and drug addict who owes money to a local dealer, and constantly criticizes Cassey for going to Revival. After Reggie comes clean about his drug addiction, Cassey again asks if the incident in which Michelle said that he had sexually assaulted her as a child had ever occurred, to which he continues to deny. After a negative run-in with Pervis, a former abuser and pimp, at the halfway house, that her friend and former co worker Nicole saves her from, she gives Michelle a handgun, should she ever run into trouble again. In the meantime, Todd reveals to Michelle that he has always had feelings for her.

One day, Michelle leaves to go to Revival. After arriving, she sees Reggie has accompanied Cassey to the service. Reggie claims he is there to apologize to the Lord for his sins, and as he tries to apologize and comes toward Michelle for a hug of sorrow, Michelle (who is very enraged) recalling the abuse and only seeing her attacker trying to come for her again, shoots him with the handgun. We cut back to present day where it is revealed that Michelle is actually serving a death sentence for his murder. She admits to the Bishop that what she did was wrong, and asks the Bishop to tell her mother that she loves her, despite everything that has happened. The Bishop tells Michelle that he has been praying for her, and he says that she will be alright before he leaves. Throughout the film, when the flashbacks are cut back to present day, we see Michelle designing a small wooden house out of popsicle sticks. This house is a representation of Michelle as an individual. She initially questions putting a window on the house, but the Bishop gives her the symbolic nature of the window as an opportunity. The Bishop then questions where the door is, although Michelle had not placed one. After the Bishop's departure, it is shown in a new present day that Michelle's cell is now empty. This is to imply that Michelle's death sentence had been carried out. However, the film ends with a shot in the cell of the house, which now has a door is now on it as well. The film's end credits state that although Michelle was a fictional character, this type of story does actually happen, and the website womanthouartloosed.com is displayed.

Cast

Reception 
On review aggregate website Rotten Tomatoes, Women Thou Art Loosed has a 51% approval rating based on 59 reviews. The site's critics consensus reads, "While Woman is a little less heavy-handed than other message movies, it still feels like an After School Special."

In USA Today, Claudia Puig wrote, "A movie based on a self-help novel is an iffy proposition, but Kimberly Elise's performance raises Woman Thou Art Loosed to a compelling drama about a young woman's lifetime of abuse, addiction, imprisonment and poverty." Ann Hornaday of The Washington Post added Elise "carries the film in a role that asks her to be sullen, haunted, wounded and radiant...[taking] command of the screen with power and assurance as a young woman at war within her own nature between rage and repentance."

Awards
The film was nominated for two NAACP Image Awards, winning the award for Outstanding Independent or Foreign Film. Elise and Devine received nominations at the Independent Spirit Awards for Best Female Lead and Best Supporting Female, respectively. At the Black Reel Awards, Elise won for Best Actress in an Independent Film and Michael Schultz won for Best Director of an Independent Film. 

Woman Thou Art Loosed was also awarded at the American Black Film Festival for Best Film.

Sequel
A sequel, titled Woman Thou Art Loosed: On the 7th Day, was released on April 13, 2012.

References

External links
 
 
 
 Magnolia Films

2004 films
2004 independent films
2000s English-language films
2004 drama films
African-American drama films
Hood films
Films about religion
Films based on American novels
Films about domestic violence
Films about capital punishment
Films directed by Michael Schultz
Magnolia Pictures films
2000s American films